J.D Birla Institute (JDBI) Kolkata is a private unaided college affiliated to Jadavpur University, Kolkata. The late Sushila Devi Birla, wife of industrialist late L. N. Birla established a college for girls in her mother-in-law's name in June 1962. The college was named Smt.  Jawahari Devi Birla Institute of Home Science and it filled a much-felt gap in the scientific education of young women from Kolkata's conservative families. Over five decades, the institute has grown with the needs and demands of the changing times.

A Department of Commerce was added in 1997 and in tune with the shifting zeitgeist; another campus was started in 2002 to house the co-educational Department of Management. At this time, the name of the institution was simplified to J. D. Birla Institute. In the year 2009, four new professionally-oriented under-graduate B.Sc. courses (Food Science & Nutrition Management; Textile Science, Clothing & Fashion Studies; Interior Designing and Human Development) were introduced apart from two new post-graduate M.Sc. courses (Food & Nutrition and Textiles & Clothing) in 2009. M.Com. was introduced and the Home Science Programme discontinued in 2013.

References

External links 
 Institute website

Universities and colleges in Kolkata
Jadavpur University
1962 establishments in West Bengal
Educational institutions established in 1962